The Earth Friends Tokyo Z is a professional basketball team that competes in the second division of the Japanese B.League.

Roster

Notable players

Shinji Akiba
Zach Andrews
Cinmeon Bowers
Ruben Boykin
Kyle Casey
Will Creekmore
Nnanna Egwu
Luke Evans (fr)
Robert Gilchrist
Deon Jones
Nigel Spikes
Ričmonds Vilde

Coaches

Shuji Ono
Taku Saito
Satoru Furuta
Shunsuke Todo
Hugo López (basketball)

Arenas
Ota City General Gymnasium
Katayanagi Arena
Setagaya Ward Okura Sports Park Gymnasium

References

 
Basketball teams in Japan
Sports teams in Tokyo
Basketball teams established in 2014
2014 establishments in Japan